Gopalnagar is a village in Singur CD Block in Hooghly district in the  state  West Bengal, India.

Geography 

Demographics
As per the 2011 Census of India Gopalnagar had a total population of 12,232 of which 6,278 (51%) were males and 5,954 (49%) were females. Population below 6 years was 933. The total number of literates in Gopalnagar was 9,901 (87.63% of the population over 6 years).

Economy

Tata Motors at Singur

Singur gained international media attention since Tata Motors started constructing a factory to manufacture their $2,500 car, the Tata Nano at Singur. The small car was scheduled to roll out of the factory by 2008. In October 2008 Tatas announced withdrawal from the project. Six villages – Bajemelia, Beraberi, Gopalnagar, Joymolla, Khaser Bheri and Sinher Bheri – were affected by land acquisition. In 2016, the Supreme Court quashed the West Bengal government’s acquisition of 997 acres of agricultural land for Tata Motors and ordered its return to 9,117 landowners.

Education
Gopalnagar High School is a coeducational higher secondary school, established in 1962 at PO Gopalnagar Harharia. It has arrangements for teaching Bengali, English, history, geography, political science, economics and mathematics.

Transport
Singur railway station is the nearest railway station.

References

Villages in Hooghly district